Ringo the Lone Rider is a 1968 Spanish-Italian Spaghetti Western film directed by Rafael Romero Marchent.

Cast

Releases
Wild East Productions released this on a limited edition DVD in 2008 alongside Eurospy film The Cobra, also starring Peter Martell.

References

External links

1968 films
Spaghetti Western films
Spanish Western (genre) films
1968 Western (genre) films
Films directed by Rafael Romero Marchent
Films scored by Francesco De Masi
1960s Italian films